The Government of Gujarat, also known as Gujarat Government, is the supreme governing authority of the Indian state of Gujarat and its 33 districts. It consists of an executive of the legislators appointed by the Governor of Gujarat, a judiciary and of a publicly elected legislative body.

Like other states in India, the head of state of Gujarat is the Governor, appointed by the President of India on the advice of the Central (Union) government. The governor's role is largely ceremonial, but the governor considers the legislative composition and appoints the Chief Minister, who is the main head of government, as chair of the Council of Ministers of Gujarat and is vested, in some instances alone but as to most executive powers by Council consensus with virtually all of the executive powers.

Gandhinagar, the capital of Gujarat, houses the relevant Vidhan Sabha (also known as the Gujarat Legislative Assembly) and the secretariat. The Gujarat High Court in Ahmedabad, has jurisdiction over the state as to state laws.

The present legislative assembly is unicameral, consisting of 182 Members of the Legislative Assembly (M.L.As). Its term is 5 years, unless sooner dissolved.

Executive

Legislature

See also 
 Politics of Gujarat

Notes

References

External links 
 Official Gujarat State Portal
 Chief Minister of Gujarat
 NIC, Gujarat State Centre